Nakia is a character appearing in American comic books published by Marvel Comics. Created by Christopher Priest and Mark Texeira, the character first appeared in Black Panther vol. 3 #1 (November 1998).

Lupita Nyong'o portrays Nakia in the Marvel Cinematic Universe films Black Panther (2018) and the sequel Black Panther: Wakanda Forever (2022).

Publication history
The character was introduced in Black Panther vol. 3 #1 (Nov. 1998) and was created by Christopher Priest and Mark Texeira.

Fictional character biography
As a child, Nakia of the Q'Noma Valley marsh tribe was picked by her tribal elders to be Wakandan Dora Milaje, "Adored Ones" or wives-in-training and spent three years training before being presented to King T'Challa; barely a teenager, she was instantly smitten with him, although he promised that her role was purely ceremonial. She became close friends with her fellow Dora Milaje, Okoye who, unlike her, took satisfaction with being just his bodyguard. Nakia's obsession with King T'Challa increased dramatically when Mephisto cast an illusion over T'Challa causing him to kiss Nakia. She consequently became jealous of T'Challa's American ex-girlfriend Monica Lynne and plotted to kill her, but T'Challa rescued her and banished Nakia bringing great shame on her tribe and Wakanda.

Nakia was captured by Achebe and tortured by him until Erik Killmonger came and freed her. Killmonger used the Altar of Resurrection on her and in the process gained enhanced abilities. Killmonger decided to name her Malice after the previous one. She went after T'Challa and his female allies and while battling Queen Divine Justice, killed one of T'Challa's allies, Nicole "Nikki" Adams.

She later teamed up with Man-Ape and kidnapped several of T'Challa's friends poisoning them out of revenge. Further, Nakia also planned on killing Monica and Dakota North, believing that the latter was also one of T'Challa's lovers. In the end, T'Challa foils the plan of Nakia, who manages to escape but not without giving him the antidote for his friends.

Nakia finally returned during a mission involving Everett K. Ross. When Ross is captured and tortured by the Hatut Zeraze (War Dogs), Nakia steps in to rescue him. Despite this, she is still in exile from the Dora Milaje. Embittered and cast out, Nakia developed an arsenal of weapons, including an herb named the jufeiro that gives her power over men. But longtime use of the drug made her grossly ill. In a desperate attempt to lure the Black Panther to her before she dies, Nakia tracked down a long forgotten Dora Milaje weapon called the Mimic-27 which can change and morph its shape and form as well as create ability-duplicating doppelgangers. She left Hydro-Man in charge of the A.I.M base where she nicked it from in case her hated sisterhood ever caught up with her.

Nakia eventually decided to send Mimic-27 after T'Challa's ex-wife, Ororo Monroe (aka Storm of the X-Men), but the weapon broke free of Nakia's control and attacked her, too. To stop it, the Dora Milaje needed Nakia's help, but she refused to act until she could see her king again. After meeting up with her beloved T'Challa, the Wakandan King requested she aid the Dora Milaje in stopping the now out of control doomsday weapon running amok in Harlem, Massachusetts. She and her former sisterhood would travel to an Astral Plane where the consciousness of said Living Vibranium weapon was housed. While the heroes of New York battled the rogue Mimic's self created doppelgängers, Nakia and the other Dora's battled its tainted sentience which had been poisoned by her own malignance. Nakia gained the strength of self to overcome her mirror reflection and finally quelled the mimic, but died in the process as it was also holding back the cancerous element ravaging her body. In honor for her sacrifice, she was taken back to Wakanda and given a proper burial with full honors by the Black Panther and his Adored Ones, Spider-Man, and the X-Men along with a cadre of Avengers.

Powers and abilities 
Due a magical ritual, Nakia possesses a superhuman level of strength, speed, agility, and accuracy. As a member of the Dora Milaje, Nakia is an expert hand-to-hand combattant. She uses a barbed blade and a projectile blade launcher.

Reception

Accolades 
 In 2018, CinemaBlend included Nakia in their "5 Marvel Villains We'd Love To See In Black Panther 2" list.
 In 2018, Comicbook.com included Nakia in their "7 Great Villains for Black Panther 2" list.
 In 2020, CBR.com ranked Nakia 9th in their "Marvel: Ranking Black Panther's Rogues Gallery" list.
 In 2022, Screen Rant included Nakia in their "10 Best Black Panther Comics Characters Not In The MCU" list.

In other media

Television

 Nakia makes a non-speaking cameo appearance in the Avengers: Earth's Mightiest Heroes episode "Welcome to Wakanda" as a member of the Dora Milaje.

Film

Nakia appears in films set in the Marvel Cinematic Universe, portrayed by Lupita Nyong'o. This version hails from Wakanda's River Tribe, is a former Dora Milaje who became a War Dog, an international spy for Wakanda, and was previously in a relationship with T'Challa.
 She first appears in Black Panther (2018). Following the death of his father T'Chaka, T'Challa brings Nakia back to Wakanda to accompany him as he is crowned the new king and on a mission to capture Ulysses Klaue. After Killmonger arrives in Wakanda and seemingly kills T'Challa for Wakanda's throne, Nakia recovers a heart-shaped herb and accompanies T'Challa's sister Shuri, mother Ramonda, and acquaintance Everett K. Ross in an attempt to enlist M'Baku's help in overthrowing Killmonger in spite of Ramonda's pleas for her to ingest the herb. However, they find a comatose T'Challa and revive him before joining him in retaking Wakanda. Following Killmonger's defeat, Nakia and T'Challa rekindle their relationship and she accepts a new position running a Wakandan outreach center in California.
 As of Black Panther: Wakanda Forever, Nyong'o stated that Nakia has "matured" following both the Blip and the death of T'Challa, explaining that her character's "priorities have shifted and sharpened" while adding that she still remains "the one you want to call when you're in trouble". Following the aforementioned events, Nakia moved to Haiti to secretly raise her and T'Challa's son, Toussaint, away from the pressures of living in Wakanda.

Video games

 Nakia appears as in Lego Marvel Super Heroes 2, as part of the "Black Panther" DLC.

References

Marvel Comics characters who can move at superhuman speeds
Marvel Comics characters with superhuman strength
Marvel Comics military personnel
Marvel Comics mutates
Fictional women soldiers and warriors
Wakandans